The Mizoram State Museum is in Aizawl, Mizoram, India. It is an ethnographic museum with multipurpose collections on display. There are five galleries: Textile Gallery, Ethnology, History, Anthropology, Natural History, and an Archaeology Terrace. The collection occupies four floors.

The museum was established in April 1977 by the Tribal Research Institute under Education Department. From 1989, it came under Art and Culture department. The museum was earlier housed in a rented building but on 14 July 1990 it was moved to a new building, at Mc Donald Hill. The museum galleries have undergone a lot of renovation under the care of Indian Museum, Kolkata. Financial assistance was also received from Victoria Memorial, Kolkata.

Gallery

References

External links

 Art & Culture Department, Government of Mizoram

Aizawl
State museums in India
Ethnic museums in India
Tourist attractions in Mizoram
Museums established in 1977
1977 establishments in Mizoram